Flachat is a French surname. Notable people with the surname include:

Eugène Flachat (1802–1873), French civil engineer
Stéphane Flachat (1800–1884), French engineer, businessman, Saint-Simonian, and politician

French-language surnames